The 2017–18 Telenet UCI Cyclo-cross World Cup was a season long cyclo-cross competition, organised by the Union Cycliste Internationale (UCI). The UCI Cyclo-cross World Cup took place between 17 September 2017 and 28 January 2018, over a total of nine events. The defending champions were Wout van Aert in the men's competition and Sophie de Boer in the women's competition.

Both elite titles were won at the penultimate round of the season at Nommay. Despite finishing twelfth in the race, Sanne Cant won the women's title after her closest rival Kaitlin Keough finished the Nommay race in second behind compatriot Katie Compton. Cant was the only female rider to win more than once, winning five times during the season. Other races were won by Kateřina Nash, Maud Kaptheijns and Evie Richards, who became the first under-23 woman to win an elite race, when she won at Namur.

In the men's competition, Mathieu van der Poel won each of the first four races to build up a lead on van Aert and the rest. Van Aert won the next two races in Germany and at Namur, but with wins at Heusden-Zolder and Nommay, van der Poel gathered an unassailable lead going into the final round at Hoogerheide; he won that race as well, garnering podium finishes at all nine events during the campaign.

The men's under-23 title was won by Tom Pidcock, having won four World Cup races in as many starts, giving him an unassailable lead after the Grand Prix Erik De Vlaeminck at Circuit Zolder, as a rider's best four scores (from seven races) counted towards the classification. The women's under-23 title was won by Fleur Nagengast, while the junior men's title went to Tomáš Kopecký.

Points distribution
Points were awarded to all eligible riders each race. The top ten finishers received points according to the following table:

 Elite riders finishing in positions 11 to 50 also received points, going down from 40 points for 11th place by one point per place to 1 point for 50th place.
 For the age group riders (excluding under-23 women), those finishing in positions 11 to 30 also received points, going down from 20 points for 11th place by one point per place to 1 point for 30th place. As well as this, only the top four scores for each rider count towards the World Cup standings.

Events
In comparison to last season, the races in Las Vegas, Rome (Fiuggi) and Valkenburg were replaced by Bogense, Nommay and Waterloo. The race in Bogense marked the first ever Cyclo-cross World Cup in Denmark, as a precursor to the 2019 UCI Cyclo-cross World Championships being held there.

Final points standings

Elite men

Elite women

Under-23 men

Under-23 women

Junior men

Notes

References

Sources

External links

World Cup
World Cup
UCI Cyclo-cross World Cup